Nebulon may refer to:

 Nebulon (comics), a fictional character in the Marvel Universe
 Nebulon, a fictional character from Homestar Runner

See also 
 Nebulon-B frigate, a fictional starship in Star Wars